Milford is a suburb located on the North Shore, Auckland. It is located on northern side of Lake Pupuke. It also has a popular swimming beach, which runs some two kilometers from Black Rock in the south to Castor Bay in the north. The Wairau Creek reaches the sea at the Hauraki Gulf at the northern end of Milford Beach, and its lower tidal reaches host the Milford Marina.

Milford is part of the  electorate, which is currently represented by National member of parliament Simon Watts.

Demographics

Milford had a population of 5,019 at the 2018 New Zealand census, an increase of 252 people (5.3%) since the 2013 census, and an increase of 246 people (5.2%) since the 2006 census. There were 2,025 households, comprising 2,358 males and 2,664 females, giving a sex ratio of 0.89 males per female, with 720 people (14.3%) aged under 15 years, 822 (16.4%) aged 15 to 29, 2,262 (45.1%) aged 30 to 64, and 1,215 (24.2%) aged 65 or older.

Ethnicities were 72.4% European/Pākehā, 4.1% Māori, 1.2% Pacific peoples, 24.3% Asian, and 3.4% other ethnicities. People may identify with more than one ethnicity.

The percentage of people born overseas was 40.4, compared with 27.1% nationally.

Although some people chose not to answer the census's question about religious affiliation, 50.5% had no religion, 37.8% were Christian, 0.1% had Māori religious beliefs, 1.0% were Hindu, 1.3% were Muslim, 1.5% were Buddhist and 2.1% had other religions.

Of those at least 15 years old, 1,602 (37.3%) people had a bachelor's or higher degree, and 408 (9.5%) people had no formal qualifications. 1,182 people (27.5%) earned over $70,000 compared to 17.2% nationally. The employment status of those at least 15 was that 1,980 (46.1%) people were employed full-time, 585 (13.6%) were part-time, and 126 (2.9%) were unemployed.

Economy

Milford Centre

Milford Centre shopping centre opened in Milford during the early 1990s and was sold to new proprietors in 2006. It covers 14,000 m². It consists of 757 carparks and 65 retailers, including The Warehouse and a Countdown supermarket.

Education

It is a state integrated Catholic school, which was founded in 1957.

It opened in 1926 as a spillover from Takapuna School, and became an independent school in 1946.

Rolls are as of

Notes

External links
 Photographs of Milford held in Auckland Libraries' heritage collections.

Suburbs of Auckland
North Shore, New Zealand
Populated places around the Hauraki Gulf / Tīkapa Moana
Populated lakeshore places in New Zealand